Brownbill is a surname. Notable people with the surname include:

Derek Brownbill (born 1954), English footballer
Fanny Brownbill (1890–1948), Australian politician
Kay Brownbill (1914–2002), Australian politician
William Brownbill (1864–1938), Australian politician